The East Shetland Basin is a major oil-producing area of the North Sea between Scotland and Norway.

Oil produced in the UK area is landed at Sullom Voe Terminal in the Shetland Islands. Associated gas flows via the FLAGS pipeline to St Fergus Gas Terminal.

The UK East Shetland Basin includes the following oil and gas fields and accumulations:

 Alwyn North
 Barra
 Brent
 Broom
 Causeway
 Cheviot
 Cladhan
 Conrie
 Cormorant
 Deveron
 Don
 Dunbar
 Eider
 Ellon
 Falcon
 Fionn
 Grant
 Harris
 Heather
 Hudson
 Hutton
 Islay
 Jura
 Kestrel
 KrakenLyell
 Magnus
 Merlin
 Murchison
 Ninian
 Nuggets
 Orlando
 Otter
 Pelican
 Penguin
 Playfair
 Rhum
 Strathspey
 Tern
 Thistle
 Ythan

See also
Energy policy of the United Kingdom
Energy use and conservation in the United Kingdom
List of North Sea Oil and Gas Fields

References 

Oil fields of Scotland
North Sea energy
Oil and gas industry in Shetland
Norway–Scotland relations